Tajul Islam was a shifting worker at the Adamjee Jute Mills in Bangladesh. He was killed on February 29, 1984 at the mills by the armed cadres loyal to the autocratic regime of Hussain Muhammad Ershad and died receiving treatment on March 1. After completing higher education in economics at Dhaka University, he became involved in trade unionism in 1974 and went on to become the leader of the Adamjee Majdur (worker) Trade Union.

In 1984, eleven workers’ federations called a strike at all mills and factories on March 1, the same day he was killed, to press home their five demands that included trade union rights and a minimum wage scale of Tk 650. The then 15-party and 7-party alliances expressed solidarity with the programme that also demanded withdrawal of martial law.
Website :

References

Bangladeshi trade unionists
Bangladeshi communists
Bangladeshi murder victims
1984 deaths